Stefan Rinke (born December 31, 1965) is a German historian and specialist in Latin American history. Since 2005 he has been professor at the Institute of Latin American Studies and at the Friedrich-Meinecke-Institut at Freie Universität Berlin.

Biography 

After graduating from the Gymnasium Julianum in Helmstedt in 1984, Stefan Rinke studied history and American studies in Bamberg and Bowling Green (Ohio) from 1985 to 1990. He completed his studies in 1989 with a Master of Arts in Bowling Green and in 1990 with a diploma in history in Bamberg. The Friedrich-Ebert-Stiftung supported him with a doctoral scholarship from 1991 to 1993. In 1995 he received his doctorate at the Catholic University of Eichstätt with a thesis on German-Latin American relations during the Weimar Republic from a transnational perspective. His advisor was Hans-Joachim König. The work appeared in 1996 as the first volume in the series Historamericana, which was founded by König and Rinke. Since 2021, the series Historamericana has been published by the renowned Wissenschaftliche Buchgesellschaft (Darmstadt) and is available as  Open Access Gold and Print on Demand.

From 1996 to 1998, the German Research Foundation (DFG) granted him a postdoctoral fellowship. During this time he spent research periods in Santiago de Chile and Washington D.C., among other places. In September 1998 he was appointed Visiting Assistant Professor for the Comparative History of the Americas and Europe at Tufts University, where he taught until 1999.

In the same year, Stefan Rinke took up a position as assistant professor (Wissenschaftlicher Assistant) in Eichstätt. In 2003, he completed his ‘Habilitation’ with a study on North Americanization and socio-cultural change in Chile. In 2005, he was appointed professor of Latin American history at Freie Universität Berlin. From 2007 to 2009 and from 2017 to 2019 he was chairman of the Institute of Latin American Studies.

Research focus 
Stefan Rinke explores the history of Latin America primarily from a transregional and global historical perspective. His research focuses on cultural globalization and North Americanization, popular culture, revolutions, memory and historical consciousness, history of knowledge, trans-American relations, temporality and future. They cover the period from colonial times (Columbus, Conquista of Mexico, identities), the independence period (Atlantic revolutions, thinking about the future), the 19th century (state-building and dictatorships, USA and Latin America), the 20th century (World War I, football, aviation, experts) to contemporary history (memory and conflict in Columbia and Chile, Colonia Dignidad). His territorial focus lies on Chilean and Mexican history, among others.

International activities 
Stefan Rinke has been Visiting Professor and Research Fellow at leading international universities, including El Colegio de México and Pontificia Universidad Católica de Chile.

From 2009 to 2018, he was spokesperson of the first German-Latin American Research Training Group (IGK 1531 "Between Spaces - Entre Espacios"), a cooperation with Mexican partners dedicated to interdisciplinary research on globalization in history and the present. In the Collaborative Research Center 700 "Governance in Spaces of Limited Statehood" he served as co-spokesperson from 2010 to 2017.

In 2014 he organized the European Congress of Historians of Latin America at Freie Universität and was president of the Asociación de Historiadores Latinoamericanistas Europeos (AHILA) from 2014 to 2017.

Since 2019, Stefan Rinke has been the spokesperson of the International Research Training Group "Temporalities of Future in Latin America: Dynamics of Aspiration and Anticipation," a German-Mexican cooperation dedicated to researching temporalities of the future within the humanities and social sciences. In 2019, the German Foreign Office approved his oral history project on Colonia Dignidad in Chile.

Stefan Rinke is a host to numerous scholarship holders and researchers from all over the world. He also successfully nominated the historians. He has also successfully nominated the historians Hilda Sabato (2011), Irina Podgorny (2013), Raanan Rein (2016), Max Paul Friedman (2018), Ricardo Pérez Montfort (2020) and Lilia Moritz Schwarcz (2021) for Alexander von Humboldt Foundation Awards.

He has supervised numerous doctorates. Several of the doctoral theses have received awards. Rinke's students hold professorships in Argentina, Brazil, Chile, Costa Rica, Denmark, Colombia, Mexico, Peru and Switzerland. In addition, he has acted as supervisor to a successfully completed habilitation as well as to numerous projects by postdocs from Germany and abroad.

Rinke is a member of the advisory board of the German Historical Institute Washington D.C. and Berkeley, the Centro Maria Sibylla Merian de Estudios Avanzados (CALAS) in Guadalajara, Mexico, and the Einstein Foundation Berlin. He is also a member of the editorial board of international scientific journals. He regularly reviews for academic publishers, journals and scientific organizations on three continents.

Awards and honors 
In 2003, Stefan Rinke was awarded the Eichstätter Universitätsgesellschaft Prize for his habilitation thesis. For the period from 2013 to 2015 he received a Research Fellowship from the Einstein Foundation Berlin. In 2017 he was awarded the Premio Alzate of the Mexican Academy of Sciences and the Consejo Nacional de Ciencia y Tecnología (Mexico) for his complete works. In the following year the Universidad Nacional de San Martín in Buenos Aires awarded him an honorary doctorate. In 2019, the Dahlem Research School presented him with the Award for Excellent Doctoral Supervision. The Academia Mexicana de la Historia and the Ecuadorian Academia Nacional de Historia appointed Rinke a corresponding member. Rinke was honored a Talent Scout in the Henriette Herz Scouting Program of the Alexander von Humboldt Foundation in 2020.

Authored works (selection) 

 Conquistadoren und Azteken: Cortés und die Eroberung Mexikos (München: Beck, 2019). . [Conquistadors and Aztecs: Cortés and the Conquest of Mexico] (München: Beck, 2019). , Spanish translation: Conquistadores y aztecas. Cortés y la conquista de México. Spanien, edaf 2021.   .
 Historia de Latinoamérica: desde las primeras culturas hasta el presente, Jornadas 167 (Mexico: El Colegio de México, 2016).
 Lateinamerika. (Theiss, Darmstadt 2015).  [Latin America] (Theiss, Darmstadt 2015). .
 Im Sog der Katastrophe: Lateinamerika und der Erste Weltkrieg (Frankfurt a.M.: Campus, 2015). English translation: Latin America and the First World War (Cambridge: Cambridge University Press, 2017). . Spanish translation: América Latina y la primera Guerra Mundial. Una historia global (Mexico: FCE, 2019). .
 Kolumbus und der Tag von Guanahani 1492: Ein Wendepunkt der Geschichte [Columbus and the Day of Guanahani: A Turning Point in History] (Stuttgart: Theiss, 2013). .
 together with Frederik Schulze: Kleine Geschichte Brasiliens [Short History of Brazil] (München: Beck, 2013). .
 Lateinamerika und die USA: Eine Geschichte zwischen Räumen – von der Kolonialzeit bis heute, Geschichte Kompakt [Latin America and the United States: A History Between Spaces – from Colonial Times to the Present] (Darmstadt: Wissenschaftliche Buchgesellschaft, 2012, . Spanish translation: América Latina y Estados Unidos: Una historia entre espacios desde la época colonial hasta hoy (Madrid/México: Marcial Pons/El Colegio de México, 2015). .
 Revolutionen in Lateinamerika: Wege in die Unabhängigkeit, 1760–1830 1830 [Revolutions in Latin America: Paths to Independence, 1760-1830] (München: Beck, 2010). . Spanish translation: Las revoluciones en América Latina: Las vías a la independencia, 1760–1830 (México: El Colegio de México, 2011) .
 Geschichte Lateinamerikas: Von den frühesten Kulturen bis zur Gegenwart. Beck-Wissen [A History of Latin America: From the Earliest Cultures to the Present] (München: Beck, 2010; 2. Aufl. 2014), . Portuguese translation: História de América Latina: Das Culturas Pre-Colombianas até o Presente (Porto Alegre: ediPUCRS 2012), .
 Kleine Geschichte Chiles [Short History of Chile] (München: Beck, 2007), .
 Begegnungen mit dem Yankee: Nordamerikanisierung und soziokultureller Wandel in Chile, 1898–1990 [Encounters with the Yankee: North Americanization and Socio-Cultural Change in Chile, 1898-1990], Lateinamerikanische Forschungen 32 (Köln: Böhlau, 2004). . Spanish translation: Encuentros con el yanqui: norteamericanización y cambio sociocultural en Chile 1898–1990 (Santiago de Chile: DIBAM, 2013). .
 Cultura de masas, reforma y nacionalismo en Chile, 1910–1931 [Mass Culture, Reform, and Nationalism in Chile, 1910-1931] (Valparaíso: Universidad Católica/Centro de Investigaciones Diego Barros Arana, 2002), .
 "Der letzte freie Kontinent": Deutsche Lateinamerikapolitik im Zeichen transnationaler Beziehungen, 1918–1933, ["The Last Free Continent“: German Latin American Relations in Transnational Perspective] (Stuttgart: Heinz, 1996), .
 Zwischen Weltpolitik und Monroe Doktrin: Botschafter Speck von Sternburg und die deutsch-amerikanischen Beziehungen, 1898–1908 [Between World Politics and Monroe Doctrine: Ambassador Speck von Sternburg and German-American Relations, 1898-1908] (Stuttgart: Heinz, 1992). .

Edited works (selection) 

 with Carlos Riojas (eds.), Repensar el “Mundo”: Reflexiones y representaciones globales (siglos XV–XX) (Darmstadt: Wissenschaftliche Buchgesellschaft 2022), . 
 with Carlos Riojas (eds.), América Latina y la historia global: Repensar el mundo (México/ Buenos Aires: Siglo XXI, 2022), .
 with Carlos Alba Vega and Marianne Braig (eds.), La violencia en América Latina entre espacios temporales del pasado y del futuro (Berlin: Tranvía, 2022).
 with Nelson Chacón (eds.), Recopilación de fuentes para la historia Mapuche, siglos XVII, XVIII y XIX: edición y comentarios (Darmstadt: Wissenschaftliche Buchgesellschaft 2021),  .
 with Federico Navarrete and Nino Vallen (eds.): Der Codex Mendoza: Das Meisterwerk aztekisch-spanischer Buchkultur (wbg Edition: Darmstadt, 2021),  .
 with Christian Cwik and Hans-Joachim König (eds.), Diktaturen in Lateinamerika im Zeitalter des Kalten Krieges (Stuttgart: Heinz, 2020),  .
 with Raanan Rein and David M.K. Sheinin (eds.): Migrants, Refugees, and Asylum Seekers in Latin America. Jewish Latin America, Vol. 12 (Leiden: Brill, 2020),  .
 with Nikolaus Böttcher and Nino Vallen (eds.), Distributive Struggle and the Self in the Early Modern World (Stuttgart: Heinz 2019).
 with Michael Wildt (eds.), Revolutions and Counter-Revolutions: 1917 and its Aftermath from a Global Perspective (Frankfurt: Campus 2017).
 with Carlos Riojas (eds.), Historia global: perspectivas y tensiones (Stuttgart: Heinz 2017).
 with Raanan Rein and Nadia Zysman (eds.), The New Ethnic Studies in Latin America (Leiden: Brill, 2017).
 with Mónika Contreras Saiz and Tajana Louis (eds.), Memoria y conflicto - memorias en conflicto: intercambios metódicos y teóricos de experiencias locales latinoamericanas  (Stuttgart: Heinz 2016).
 with Ingrid Kummels, Claudia Rauhut and Birte Timm (eds.), Transatlantic Caribbean: Dialogues of People, Practice, Ideas (Bielefeld: Transcript, 2014).
 with Delia González de Reufels (eds.), Expert Knowledge in Latin American History: Local, Transnational, and Global Perspectives (Stuttgart: Heinz, 2014).
 with Mónika Contreras Saiz and Lasse Hölck (eds.), Gobernanza y seguridad: la conquista republicana de las fronteras latinoamericanas en el siglo XIX (Stuttgart: Heinz, 2014).
 with Diego Armus (eds.): Del football al fútbol/futebol: Historias argentinas, brasileras y uruguayas en el siglo XX (Frankfurt a.M./Madrid: Vervuert, 2014).
 with Kay Schiller (eds.): The FIFA World Cup 1930–2010: Politics, Commerce, Spectacle and Identities (Göttingen: Wallstein, 2014).
 with Carlos Alba and Marianne Braig (eds.), Latin America and Asia – Relations in the context of Globalization from Colonial Times to the Present. América Latina y Asia – relaciones en el context de la globalización de la época colonia hasta el presente (Stuttgart: Heinz,     2014).
 with Christina Peters (eds.): Global Play: Football Between Region, Nation, and the World in Latin American, African, and European History (Stuttgart: Heinz, 2014).
 with Georg Fischer, Christina Peters, Frederik Schulze (eds.): Brasilien in der Welt: Region, Nation und Globalisierung, 1870–1945 (Frankfurt a.M.: Campus 2013).
 with Carlos Alba, Marianne Braig and Guillermo Zermeño (eds.): Entre Espacios: Movimientos, actores y representaciones de la globalización (Berlin: Tranvía, 2013).
 with Hans-Peter Hinz and Frederik Schulze (eds.): Bicentenario: 200 Jahre Unabhängigkeit in Lateinamerika. Geschichte zwischen Erinnerung und Zukunft (Stuttgart-Berlin: Heinz-Deutsches Historisches Museum, 2011).
 with Inga Luther, Nina Elsemann and Franka Bindernagel (eds.): Erinnerung schreibt Geschichte: Lateinamerika und Europa im Kontext transnationaler Verflechtungen. (Stuttgart: Heinz, 2011).
 together with Helmut Bley, Hans-Joachim König and Kirsten Rüther, ed. of the dimension Global Interaction, Enzyklopädie der Neuzeit [Encyclopedia of the Early Modern Period], 16 vols. (Stuttgart: Metzler, 2005-2012). .
 together with Hans-Joachim König editor of the book series HISTORAMERICANA (Stuttgart: Heinz, since 2021 Darmstadt: Wissenschaftliche Buchgesellschaft).
 together with Jörg Baberowski and Michael Wildt editor of the book series Eigene und Fremde Welten (Frankfurt a.M.: Campus)
 Co-editor of the book series Inter-American Perspectives (Münster: Lit; Tempe: Bilingual Press).
 Co-editor of the book series War Hi)Stories (Paderborn: Schöningh).
 Co-editor of Boletín del Instituto de Historia Argentina y Americana Dr. Emilio Ravignani (Buenos Aires: Universidad de Buenos Aires), .
 Co-editor of Geschichte und Gesellschaft (Göttingen: Vandenhoek & Ruprecht), .
 Co-editor of Historia (Santiago de Chile: Pontificia Universidad Católica). .
 Co-editor of Iberoamericana: América Latina, España, Portugal (Frankfurt a.M./Madrid: Vervuert). .

References

External links 
 
 Literature by and about Stefan Rinke in the catalogue of Ibero-Amerikanisches Institut.
 Stefan Rinke on the pages of the Institute of Latin American Studies at Freie Universität Berlin.
 Interview with Stefan Rinke in the review História, Ciencias, Saude-Manguinhos.
 Interview with Stefan Rinke by Einstein Stiftung Berlin.
 Interview with Stefan Rinke in the Deep Dive Podcast
 International Research Training Group "Between Spaces - Entre Espacios".
 Asociación de Historiadores Latinoamericanistas Europeos (AHILA).
 Stefan Rinke on ORCID
 Interview with Stefan Rinke: Diálogos desde la Academia Mexicana de la Historia (October 2022)

1965 births
Academic staff of the Free University of Berlin
Historians of Latin America
20th-century German historians
Living people
21st-century German historians